Aska Yang (born April 4, 1978 in Taoyuan City (now Taoyuan District), Taiwan) is a Taiwanese Mandopop singer.

Education
He graduated from the National Changhua University of Education (NCUE), with a major in Guidance and Counselling. During his study at NCUE, he attended singing contests and won some prizes. He is now studying a master's degree program in the Sports Psychology Department at the National Taiwan Sport University (NTSU).

Music career

One Million Star (2007)
Aska Yang debut in Taiwan as a contestant on season one of Taiwanese TV singing contest One Million Star. He sang songs such as "再見我的愛人" (Goodbye My Love), "人質" (Hostage), "背叛" (Betrayal), "新不了情" (New Endless Love).

Nevertheless, the final ten contestants, including Yang, had released two compilation albums, Stars Reunion (星光同學會-超級星光大道10強紀念合輯) and Yesterday, Today, Tomorrow (愛.星光精選-昨天 今天 明天) in June and October respectively. He recorded a total of four songs in both albums:
 "Because I believe (因為我相信)" – jointly sang with other contestants;
 "Betrayal (背叛)" –  originally sung by Gary Cao;
 "Hostage (人質)" –  originally sung by A-mei; and
 "Broken Wings (多餘)" – theme song from the movie "Keep Watching (沈睡的青春)", and it is the first original song of Aska Yang.
Later in the year, he was involved in a tense contract dispute with his manager, Hsu An-chin.  Because of the press attention, his name was frequently mentioned in the entertainment news headlines, in a sensational way, throughout the whole year of 2007.  For example, he was ranked second in "Person of the Year" by Yahoo!Taiwan and was also listed in a book called "Who's Who in the ROC, 2007–2008".

Debut album and concert (2008)
After reaching an agreement with his manager at the end of 2007, his musical career formally started. He released his debut solo album, titled Dove (鴿子), in January 2008, and it became the best-selling album in the first half of the year. The tracks "洋蔥" (Onion), "鴿子" (Dove) and "幸福的風" (Wind of Happiness) are listed at number 1, 5 and 12 respectively on Hit Fm Taiwan's Hit Fm Annual Top 100 Singles Chart (Hit-Fm年度百首單曲) for 2008. The track, "鴿子" (Dove) won one of the Top 10 Songs of the Year and "洋蔥" (Onion) won Best Loved Song by Audience at the 2009 HITO Radio Music Awards presented by Taiwanese radio station Hit FM.

His fan base began to expand to other regions like Singapore, Malaysia and Hong Kong. Yang also played his first solo concert in Taipei Arena in May, just four months after the release of his debut album. However, after the solo concert, he was embroiled in conflict with his manager again. The dispute resulted in a sudden pause in his career. In October 2008, Aska Yang formally announced the termination of his contract.

Restart (2009)
While attempting to resolve the outstanding contract issues by going to court, Aska restarted his music career in early 2009. He held a mini-concert in Taipei on January 11 and also began participating in other performance events, such as TV shows, concerts and musical plays. Outside the entertainment business, he enters the Graduate Institute of Physical Education of National Taiwan Sport University to study for a master's degree in Sport and Exercise Psychology.

Discographies

Studio albums

Compilation albums

Live albums

Singles

Awards and nominations

2008：Hito Pop Music Award~ – Aska Yang along with The Million Star Gang won the 「Hito Best New Artists Award」With the 「Million Star Reunion 10 Finalist Special Album」
2008：Hito Pop Music Award  – Aska Yang along with The Million Star Gang won the {Best New Artist Award}
2008：5th Annual SuperStar Singers Award~ Aska Yang won { Best New Artist Award}
2008：Singapore Golden Melody Award – Aska Yang won 5 awards including: 「Outstanding New Artist Award」、「Best Male Singer Award」、「Most Popular New Artist Award」、「Y.E.S 933 Longest Chart Holder Song《Onion》」、「Y.E.S 933 Number # 1 on Top Ten Most Popular Song Chart 《Onion》」
2009: Singapore Entertainment Awards – Aska Yang won 3 awards : Regional Newcomer of the Year Media Award ; Most Popular Regional Newcomer ; Radio 100.3 Most Popular Song ~ Onion
2009: Hito Radio Pop Music Award –　「 2008 Best Top 10 Mandarin Songs(05)- Aska Yang (Dove) 」、「 2008 Fan's Choice Award – Aska Yang（Onion）」
2009: 2nd Annual Kiss Apple Top 10 Love Songs Award, won with《Onion》
2010: CCTV<M! Countdown  > Universal Pop Music Festival In LuoYang City  – HK/TW 2010 Media’s Most Favorite Upcoming Singer’s Award
2011: Elle  20th Anniversary People's Award~ The Greater Chinese Internet Most Favorite Male Artist Of The Year
2011: Beijing Fourth Annual MNSSE Music Billboard Award – Best Album Of The Year: PURE
2011: Third Annual Yahoo! Award『Most Favorite Male Artist Of The Year 』

Major concerts

Endorsements

Charity

2007.9 : Voice of Taipei (Hit FM) Celebrity hand-painted Signature Net Cap Auction :  Aska Yang's fans club won the highest bidding and raised NT $200,000. The money was given to the Chinese Children Home and Shelter Association.
2007.9 : Aska Yang's fans club donated the net cap to the Taipei Women Rescue Foundation (TWRF) for a live auction in the 20th anniversary of Appreciation Reception. The former chairman of TWRF, attorney Ying-Chi Liao, won the final bid of 300,000 NT dollars, and returned this monumental net cap back to Yang.
2007.9.15 : Aska Yang then offered the cap to National Changhua University of Education for collection. With Yang and his fans' help, TWRF raised a total of 1,290,136 NT dollars, on the day of the Anniversary Appreciation Reception.
2007-09-15 : Spokesman of Taipei Women's Rescue Foundation
2007       : Spokesman of the non-profit event "The Magic School"
2008-01-18 : Spokesman of the Public Traffic Safety Film Contest Sponsored by PBS Television in conjunction with Ho-Tai Automobile Manufacture.
2008-02-20 : Spokesman of Taipei Women's Rescue Foundation Charity Movie Premiere "Persepolis".
2008-05-17 : Star! Start! Solo Debut Concert at the Taipei Arena : Aska Yang donated his entire income to the victims of the Sichuan earthquake in China.
2008-06-21 : Taipei Women's Rescue Foundation~ 10 years celebration of the Domestic Violence Legislation Act.
2008-10-06 : Aska Yang donated NT$500,000 to the ChuangHua Teacher's University Alumni Association Scholarship Fund.
2009-01-23 : Aska Yang donated a " Love" necklace for the 【Go! Love】 Celebrity Auction event.  His necklace raised NT$120,900.
2009-07-27～2009-08-05 : Taiwan Red Cross fundraiser for low-income children~  Aska Yang's hand print signature card raised NT$147,532.
2009-08-14 : CTV 「Spread the Love  −88 Flood Victims Fundraiser Event」~ Aska Yang and his fans clubs donated NT$1,000,000.00
2009-08-15～2009-08-16 : Taiwan World's Vision Foundation~ 20th annual Hunger 30hours Fundraiser Event ~ Aska Yang and his fans club donated NT $500,000.

Commercial
2007 Uni-President Cup Triathlon Championship TV advertisement
2007 EZPeer TOGO MP4 player
2008 Pearly Gates~Japanese Golf Designer Name Brand
2008 Spokesman of 2008 Taiwan National Intercollegiate Athletic Games

References

External links

  Aska Yang's official website
  Aska Yang's blog
  Aska Yang discographies@Warner Music Taiwan
  Aska Yang's Weibo

1978 births
Living people
Musicians from Taoyuan City
Taiwanese Mandopop singers
One Million Star contestants
21st-century Taiwanese male  singers
People from Taoyuan District